Ab Chenar-e Olya (also Romanized as Āb Chenār-e ‘Olyā; also known as Āb Chenār-e Zīlā’ī) is a village in Barez Rural District, Manj District, Lordegan County, Chaharmahal and Bakhtiari Province, Iran. At the 2006 census, its population was 179, in 28 families.

References 

Populated places in Lordegan County